The 1994–95 Eliteserien season was the 38th season of ice hockey in Denmark. Ten teams participated in the league, and Herning IK won the championship.

First round

Final round

Group A

Group B

Playoffs

3rd place
 Rungsted IK - Vojens IK 2:0 (12:3, 7:5)

Final 
 Herning IK - Esbjerg IK 3:0 (7:1, 6:1, 9:2)

External links
Season on hockeyarchives.info

Dan
1994-95
1994 in Danish sport
1995 in Danish sport